AutoDiana was a Greek truck manufacturer based in Thessaloniki, in business between 1975 and 1984. Its main product was the 'Unicar' truck. This robust vehicle had a payload of 1500 kg and used  a Mercedes-Benz Diesel engine and Dodge axles. Its fate, along with similar Greek multi-purpose trucks, such as Petropoulos Unitrak, the Agricola, the Motoemil Autofarma, the Balkania Autotractor, the Namco Agricar, was sealed when a change of Greek law in 1984 modified taxes and duties for such farm vehicles. Production was terminated the same year ending a career of reasonable sales among customers in the Greek countryside.

References 
L.S. Skartsis and G.A. Avramidis, "Made in Greece", Typorama, Patras, Greece (2003)  (republished by the University of Patras Science Park, 2007).
L.S. Skartsis, "Greek Vehicle & Machine Manufacturers 1800 to present: A Pictorial History", Marathon (2012)  (eBook)

External links 
Trucks of the world

Defunct truck manufacturers
Off-road vehicles
Defunct motor vehicle manufacturers of Greece
Manufacturing companies based in Thessaloniki
1984 disestablishments in Greece